Dannelly is a surname. Notable people with the surname include:

Brian Dannelly, American film director and screenwriter
Charlie Smith Dannelly (born 1924), American politician

See also
Donnelly (surname)
William "Bill" Dannelly Reservoir, reservoir in Alabama, United States